1906 was the 17th season of County Championship cricket in England. The title was decided in the final round of matches with Kent County Cricket Club finishing just ahead of Yorkshire. George Hirst completed a unique "double Double" of 2,385 runs and 208 wickets. Tom Hayward broke Bobby Abel’s 1901 record for the most runs scored in a first-class season.

County Championship 

Points system:
 1 for a win
 0 for a draw, a tie or an abandoned match
 -1 for a loss

Minor Counties Championship 

Points system:
 3 for an outright win
 2 for a win on the first innings
 1 for a match with no first innings decision
 0 for a loss either outright or on the first innings of a drawn match

Wisden Cricketers of the Year 
 Jack Crawford, Arthur Fielder, Ernie Hayes, Kenneth Hutchings, Neville Knox

Leading batsmen (qualification 20 innings)

Leading bowlers (qualification 1,000 balls)

Notable events 
 By winning their last eleven county matches, Kent won the Championship for the first time after Gloucestershire beat Yorkshire by a single run at Bristol in the final round of matches
 Kent's Arthur Fielder became the first bowler to take all ten wickets in an innings in the Gentlemen v Players match at Lord's
 Tom Hayward set numerous batting records:
 The highest aggregate of runs in a first-class season – since beaten only by Compton and Bill Edrich in 1947.
 The earliest to score 2,000 runs, on 5 July.
 Two separate hundreds in consecutive matches against Nottinghamshire and Leicestershire.
 George Hirst became the only player to score 2,000 runs and take 200 wickets in a season. Against Somerset at Taunton, Hirst also became the only player to have two centuries and two five-wicket returns in one match.

See also 
 Kent County Cricket Club in 1906

References

Annual reviews 
 John Wisden’s Cricketers’ Almanack, 1907

1906 in English cricket
English cricket seasons in the 20th century